Ligature may refer to:

 Ligature (medicine), a piece of suture used to shut off a blood vessel or other anatomical structure
 Ligature (orthodontic), used in dentistry
 Ligature (music), an element of musical notation used especially in the medieval and Renaissance periods
 Ligature (instrument), a device used to attach a reed to the mouthpiece of a woodwind instrument
 Ligature (writing), a combination of two or more letters into a single symbol (typography and calligraphy)
 Ligature (grammar), a morpheme that links two words

See also
 Ligature strangulation